Mara Serena Airport is an airstrip in Masai Mara, Kenya.

Location
Mara Serena Airport  is located in Masai Mara, in Narok County, in southwestern Kenya, close to the border with Tanzania.

The geographical coordinates of this airport are:1° 24' 18.00"S, 35° 0' 36.00"E (Latitude:-1.405000; Longitude:35.010000). 
Mara Serena Airport is an all weather gravel airstrip serving tourist flights to Masai Mara. This airstrip is one of several in Masai Mara, some of which are in fact tarmac paved airstrips such as Keekorok Airstrip. In total, Masai Mara and the surrounding conservancies have a network of close to 10 airstrips and which one you fly to depends on which camp or lodge you will be staying at in the Reserve. A useful link has been provided below to see both a Map of the various airstrips as well as the details of each including Masai Mara airport codes.

Overview
Mara Serena Airport is a small civilian airport, serving Masai Mara and the neighboring communities.

Airlines and destinations

See also
 Masai Mara
 Trans Mara District
 Rift Valley Province
 Kenya Airports Authority
 Kenya Civil Aviation Authority
 List of airports in Kenya

References

External links
  Location of Mara Serena Airport At Google Maps
 Details of Some of Kenya's Airport Runways
  Website of Kenya Airports Authority
 List of Airports In Kenya
  Airkenya Routes
  Maasai Mara Map showing airstrips

Airports in Kenya
Airports in Rift Valley Province
Narok County